Alexander Groven (born 2 January 1992) (né Hassum) is a Norwegian football defender who currently plays for Hønefoss BK.

Career
He started his career in Frigg Oslo FK. He later joined Lyn Oslo's junior team. He made his senior debut on 4 October 2009 against Lillestrøm, as a substitute in the 82nd minute.

In July 2015 Groven sign a deal with Tippeligaen side Sarpsborg 08.

Ahead of the 2020 season, Groven returned to Hønefoss BK for the third time, after a year in Iceland.

Career statistics

References

External links 
 
 

1992 births
Living people
Footballers from Oslo
Norwegian footballers
Norwegian expatriate footballers
Frigg Oslo FK players
Lyn Fotball players
Hønefoss BK players
Sarpsborg 08 FF players
Knattspyrnufélag Akureyrar players
Eliteserien players
Norwegian First Division players
Norwegian Second Division players
Association football defenders
Expatriate footballers in Iceland
Norwegian expatriate sportspeople in Iceland